{{speciesbox
|name = Narrow-leaved red mallee
|image = Eucalyptus foecunda.jpg
|image_caption = Eucalyptus foecunda at Wabling Hill, Western Australia
|status = 
|status_system = 
|genus = Eucalyptus
|species = foecunda
|authority = Schauer
|synonyms_ref = 
|synonyms = 
{{collapsible list|bullets = true
|Eucalyptus aeolica Brooker MS 
|Eucalyptus foecunda subsp. aeolica Brooker MS  
|Eucalyptus foecunda subsp. nov. <small>(M.I.H.Brooker 9556)</small>
|Eucalyptus foecunda Schauer  var. foecunda 
|Eucalyptus leptophylla var. leptorrhyncha Blakely  
|Eucalyptus oleosa auct. non F.Muell. ex Miq. 
|Eucalyptus uncinata auct. non Turcz. 
}}
}}Eucalyptus foecunda, commonly known as narrow-leaved red mallee, Fremantle mallee or coastal dune mallee, is a species of plant in the myrtle family that is endemic to Western Australia. It has rough bark on the trunk, smooth bark above, narrow lance-shaped adult leaves, flower buds in groups of nine or eleven, creamy white flowers and cup-shaped fruit. It was previously included with the more widespread Eucalyptus leptophylla.thumb|225px|fruit

The bark is flaky at the base, otherwise smooth, grey and reddish-brown in colour. Flowering occurs in August or from January to February and the flowers are creamy white.

This mallee has a similar appearance to Eucalyptus petrensis but E. petrensis has a more persistent style on the fruit.Eucalyptus leucophylla was once included in E. foecunda but has broader juvenile leaves, mostly smooth bark and a shorter, more rounded operculum.

Taxonomy and namingEucalyptus foecunda was first formally described in 1844 by Johannes Conrad Schauer and the description was published in Lehmann's book Plantae Preissianae from a specimen collected at Freemantle. The specific epithet (foecunda'') refers to the prolific flowering of this species.

Distribution and habitat
Narrow-leaved red mallee grows on limy sands near the coast of Western Australia between Lancelin and Mandurah.

Conservation status
This eucalypt  is classified as "not threatened" by the Western Australian Government Department of Parks and Wildlife.

See also
List of Eucalyptus species

References

foecunda
Myrtales of Australia
Plants described in 1844
Eucalypts of Western Australia
Mallees (habit)
Taxa named by Johannes Conrad Schauer